Dalima subflavata is a moth of the family Geometridae. It is found in Sumatra, Java and Borneo.

External links
The Moths of Borneo

Boarmiini
Moths described in 1875